Dabo Aliyu CON mni psc (29 December 194713 December 2020) was acting Administrator of Anambra State from November to December 1993, and served as Administrator of Yobe State from December 1993 to August 1996 during the military regime of General Sani Abacha. He was once an assistant director NSO State House Annex, He was also the Assistant Inspector General of Police in charge of Zone 7 Abuja. He was given an award on Crime Prevention, award on best Commissioner of Police by the Inspector General of Police and also award on best policing in Anambra State. He lived in Kaduna State, and he was Sardaunan Ruma a title in his city of origin, Ruma.

Death
Aliyu reportedly died in Kaduna on December 13, 2020, after an undisclosed illness.

References

Nigerian Muslims
Governors of Anambra State
Governors of Yobe State
1947 births
2020 deaths